James Arnott may refer to:

 James Arnott (footballer), English footballer
 James Arnott (physician) (1797–1883), English physician and pioneer of cryotherapy
 James Fullarton Arnott (1914–1982), Scottish professor, author, and theatrical director